This is a list of schools in Coventry, West Midlands, England.

Government-funded schools

Primary schools

Alderman's Green Primary School, Alderman's Green
Aldermoor Farm Primary School, Stoke Aldermoor
All Saints' CE Primary School, Stoke
All Souls' RC Primary School, Chapelfields
Allesley Hall Primary School, Allesley
Allesley Primary School, Allesley
Broad Heath Community Primary School, Edgwick
Cannon Park Primary School, Cannon Park
Charter Academy, Canley
Christ The King RC Primary School, Coundon
Clifford Bridge Academy, Binley
Corpus Christi RC School, Ernesford Grange
Coundon Primary School, Coundon
Courthouse Green Primary School, Courthouse Green
Earlsdon Primary School, Earlsdon
Eastern Green Junior School, Eastern Green
Edgewick Community Primary School, Foleshill
Ernesford Grange Primary School, Ernesford Grange
Finham Primary School, Finham
Frederick Bird Primary School, Hillfields
Good Shepherd RC School, Foleshill
Gosford Park Primary School, Stoke
Grange Farm Primary School, Stivichall
Grangehurst Primary School, Longford
Hearsall Community Academy, Earlsdon
Henley Green Primary School, Wyken
Hill Farm Academy, Radford
Holbrook Primary School, Holbrooks
Hollyfast Primary School, Coundon
Holy Family RC Primary School, Holbrooks
Howes Community Primary School, Cheylesmore
John Gulson Primary School, Hillfields
John Shelton Community Primary School, Holbrooks
Joseph Cash Primary School, Radford
Keresley Grange Primary School, Brownshill Green
Leigh CE Academy, Tile Hill
Limbrick Wood Primary School, Tile Hill
Little Heath Primary School, Courthouse Green
Longford Park Primary School, Longford
Manor Park Primary School, Cheylesmore
Moat House Primary School, Wood End
Moseley Primary School, Coundon
Mount Nod Primary School, Eastern Green
Our Lady of the Assumption RC Primary School, Tile Hill
Park Hill Primary School, Eastern Green
Parkgate Primary School, Holbrooks
Pearl Hyde Community Primary School, Clifford Park
Potters Green Primary School, Potters Green
Radford Primary Academy, Radford
Ravensdale Primary School, Walsgrave
Richard Lee Primary School, Wyken
Sacred Heart RC Primary School, Stoke
St Andrew's CE Infant School, Eastern Green
St Anne's RC Primary School, Willenhall
St Augustine's RC Primary School, Radford
St Bartholomew's CE Academy, Binley
St Christopher Primary School, Allesley
St Elizabeth's RC Primary School, Foleshill
St Gregory's RC Primary School, Wyken
St John Fisher RC Primary School, Wyken
St John Vianney RC Primary School, Mount Nod
St John's CE Academy, Allesley Park
St Laurence's CE Primary School, Foleshill
St Mary and St Benedict RC Primary School, Hillfields
St Osburg's RC Primary School, Coundon
St Patrick's RC Primary School, Wood End
St Thomas More RC Primary School, Stivichall
SS Peter and Paul RC Primary School, Walsgrave
Seva School, Wyken
Sidney Stringer Primary Academy, Hillfields
Southfields Primary School, Hillfields
Sowe Valley Primary School, Binley
Spon Gate Primary School, Spon End
Stanton Bridge Primary School, Edgwick
Stivichall Primary School, Stivichall
Stoke Heath Primary School, Stoke Heath
Stoke Primary School, Stoke
Stretton CE Academy, Willenhall
Templars Primary School, Tile Hill
Walsgrave CE Academy, Walsgrave
Whitley Abbey Primary School, Whitley
Whitmore Park Primary School, Brownshill Green
Whittle Academy, Bell Green
Whoberley Hall Primary School, Whoberley
Willenhall Community Primary School, Willenhall
Wyken Croft Primary School, Wyken

Secondary schools

Barr's Hill School, Radford
Bishop Ullathorne RC School, Finham
Blue Coat CE School, Stoke
Caludon Castle School, Wyken
Cardinal Newman RC School, Keresley
Cardinal Wiseman RC School, Potters Green
Coundon Court, Coundon
Eden Girls' School, Foleshill
Ernesford Grange Community Academy, Ernesford Grange
Finham Park School, Finham
Finham Park 2, Tile Hill
Foxford Community School, Longford
Grace Academy, Potters Green
Lyng Hall School, Edgwick
President Kennedy School, Holbrooks
Seva School, Wyken
Sidney Stringer Academy, Hillfields
Stoke Park School, Stoke
West Coventry Academy, Tile Hill
The Westwood Academy, Canley
Whitley Academy, Whitley
WMG Academy for Young Engineers, Coventry

Special and alternative schools

Baginton Fields School, Willenhall
Castle Wood School, Wood End
Corley Academy, Corley, Warwickshire*
Coventry Extended Learning Centre, Wyken
Hospital Education Service, Brownshill Green
Kingsbury Academy, Coundon
Riverbank Academy, Whitley
Sherbourne Fields School, Coundon
Tiverton School, Coundon
The Warwickshire Academy, Keresley**
Woodfield School, Gibbet Hill

*This school is located in Warwickshire, but is for pupils from Coventry**This school is located in Coventry, but is for pupils from Warwickshire

Further education
City College Coventry, Hillfields
Henley College Coventry, Bell Green
Hereward College, Tile Hill

Independent schools

Primary and preparatory schools
Bablake Junior & Pre-prep School, Coundon
King Henry VIII Preparatory School, Earlsdon
Lote Tree Primary School, Foleshill

Senior and all-through schools
Bablake School, Coundon
King Henry VIII School, Earlsdon
The National Mathematics and Science College, Westwood Heath
Pattison College, Stoke Green

Special and alternative schools
Summit School, Hillfields

 
Coventry
Schools